Loups Marins River (Seal River) is a  river in the Côte-Nord region of Quebec, Canada. It empties into the Gulf of Saint Lawrence.

Location

The Loups Marins River rises on the Canadian Shield and flows south to the Saint Lawrence.
The course of the river is dictated by fractures in the bedrock.
The mouth of the river is in the municipality of Sept-Îles of the Sept-Rivières Regional County Municipality.
The name was made official on 5 December 1968. Its origin is not known.
It gives boats shelter from west winds.

Basin

The river basin cover .
It lies between the basins of the Matamec River to the west and the Pigou River to the east.
The basin is partly in the unorganized territory of Rivière-Nipissis and partly in the municipality of Sept-Îles.

Environment

A map of the ecological regions of Quebec shows the river in sub-regions 6j-T and 6m-T of the east spruce/moss subdomain.
The hoary bat (Lasiurus cinereus), suspected of being threatened or vulnerable in the province, was observed between 1999 and 2000 in a forest of firs and alders on the west side of the Loups Marins River.
The  Waterfowl concentration area of Rivière aux Loups Marins, Île de la Grande Anse, designated an IUCN Category IV Water fowl gathering area in 1998, covers the east part of the river's estuary and the coastline east to the Île de la Grande Anse.

Notes

Sources

Rivers of Côte-Nord